Steven's Croft is a wood-fired power station near Lockerbie in Scotland. It started energy production in 2008. It is operated by E.ON and produces 44 MW of electricity, burns 60% waste from timber production, 20% coppiced wood, and 20% recycled fibre. It claims to save 140,000 tonnes of greenhouse gases a year. Aqueous wastes are dispersed using a wetland filtering system.

References

External links
 AW Jenkinson Forest Products

Biofuel power stations in Scotland